Floris Historic District is a historic district that is listed on the U.S. National Register of Historic Places (NRHP).

It's located in the vicinity of the town of Herndon, Virginia, and just about one mile east of Dulles International Airport.

It includes the last remaining working farm in Fairfax County, Virginia, the Frying Pan Farm, which is now also a park.  Within that park contributing resources are the Ellmore Farm, Kidwell Farm, the Floris Vocational Technical High School Shop, the Floris School, Lee Farm Site, Frying Pan Meetinghouse.  Contributing resources outside the park, nearby, are: Higgins House, Fox House, Cherok House/Cockerill-McFarland House Site, Floris Methodist Church and Stover House.

Gallery

See also
Frying Pan Meetinghouse, nearby, also NRHP-listed

References

External links

Farms on the National Register of Historic Places in Virginia
Historic districts in Fairfax County, Virginia
National Register of Historic Places in Fairfax County, Virginia
Historic districts on the National Register of Historic Places in Virginia